The Bluefield Ridge Runners are a summer collegiate baseball team of the Appalachian League. They are located in Bluefield, West Virginia, and play their home games at Bowen Field at Peters Park.

History

Previous Bluefield teams 
Professional baseball was first played in Bluefield, West Virginia, in 1937 by the Bluefield Grays. They were affiliated with six different Major League Baseball teams and also played as an independent club for a few seasons. As the Bluefield Orioles, they were affiliated with the Baltimore Orioles, but the team ended their affiliation with Bluefield and the Appalachian League at the end of the 2010 season. Bluefield's 53-season affiliation with the Orioles, which lasted from 1958 to 2010, had been the oldest continuous affiliation with the same major league franchise in Minor League Baseball. The Bluefield Blue Jays became an affiliate organization with the Toronto Blue Jays in 2011.

Collegiate summer team 

In conjunction with a contraction of Minor League Baseball beginning with the 2021 season, the Appalachian League was reorganized as a collegiate summer baseball league, and the Bluefield Blue Jays were replaced by a new franchise in the revamped league designed for rising college freshmen and sophomores. The new team became known as the Bluefield Ridge Runners. The moniker is in reference to the city's railroading heritage. Their namesake has been a local tourist attraction since 1964. The Ridge Runner passenger train traverses a loop throughout Lottio Park beyond the right field wall at Bowen Field, the team's home ballpark.

References

External links 
 
 Statistics from Baseball-Reference

2021 establishments in Virginia
Amateur baseball teams in West Virginia
Amateur baseball teams in Virginia
Appalachian League teams
Baseball teams established in 2021
Mercer County, West Virginia
Tazewell County, Virginia